The Chancellor of the Order of the Garter is an officer of the Order of the Garter.

History of the office
When the Order of the Garter was founded in 1348 at St George's Chapel, Windsor Castle, by Edward III of England three officers were initially appointed to serve them, the Prelate, the Register and the Usher. In 1477 Edward IV decreed that the further position of Chancellor should be created to be responsible for the seal and its use. Accommodation was to be provided in what came to be called the Chancellor's Tower. The position of Chancellor was to be second in seniority to the Prelate and was granted to Richard Beauchamp, Bishop of Salisbury, and his successors in that position. At that time Windsor Chapel lay geographically in the See of Salisbury, although as a royal chapel it did not come under the direct jurisdiction of the Bishop.

The unbroken succession of Bishops of Salisbury came to an end in 1551 when Sir William Cecil was made Chancellor by Edward VI, after which a succession of lay Chancellors were appointed.

Following a number of petitions by successive Bishops of Salisbury, their right to hold the position was conceded in 1669 and on the death of Henry de Vic the honour reverted to the Bishops of Salisbury.

In 1837 boundary changes made Windsor Castle fall in the diocese of Oxford and the Chancellorship was transferred to the Bishop of Oxford. A century later, the Bishop of Salisbury again challenged the loss of the office on the grounds that the Chancellorship had been attached to his office regardless of the diocese in which the chapel of the order lay and that, in any event, St George's Chapel, as a Royal Peculiar, was not under diocesan jurisdiction. The office of Chancellor was removed from the Bishop of Oxford (the outgoing bishop, Thomas Banks Strong, had been outspoken in the abdication crisis of Edward VIII), and withheld from his successors.

The office has since been held by one of the Knights Companion.

Chancellors of the Order of the Garter

Bishops of Salisbury
1477–1481: Richard Beauchamp
1482–1484: Lionel Woodville
1485–1493: Thomas Langton
1493–1499: John Blyth
1500–1501: Henry Deane
1502–1524: Edmund Audley

Lay Chancellors
1551–1553: Sir William Cecil, Secretary of State
1553–1572: Sir William Petre, Secretary of State
1572–1577: Sir Thomas Smith,  Secretary of State
1578–1587: Sir Francis Walsingham,  Secretary of State
1587–1588: Sir Amias Paulet, Secretary of State
1589–1596: Sir John Wolley, Secretary for the Latin Tongue
1596–1607: Sir Edward Dyer
1607–1617: Sir John Herbert, Secretary of State
1617–1632: Sir George More
1632–1636: Sir Francis Crane
1637-1644: Sir Thomas Roe
1645–1658: Sir James Palmer
1658–1671: Sir Henry de Vic

Bishops of Salisbury
1671–1689: Seth Ward
1689–1715: Gilbert Burnet
1715–1721: William Talbot
1721–1723: Richard Willis
1723–1734: Benjamin Hoadly
1734–1748: Thomas Sherlock
1748–1757: John Gilbert
1757–1761: John Thomas
1761: The Hon Robert Hay Drummond
1761–1766: John Thomas
1766–1782: John Hume
1782–1791: Shute Barrington
1791–1807: John Douglas
1807–1825: John Fisher
1825–1837: Thomas Burgess

Bishops of Oxford
1837–1845: Richard Bagot
1845–1869: Samuel Wilberforce
1870–1889: John Mackarness
1889–1901: William Stubbs
1901–1911: Francis Paget
1911–1919: Charles Gore
1919–1925: Hubert Burge
1925–1937: Thomas Strong

Knights Companion Chancellors
1937–1943: The Duke of Portland 
1943–1959: The Earl of Halifax 
1960–1972: The Marquess of Salisbury 
1972–1977: The Viscount Cobham 
1977–1994: The Marquess of Abergavenny 
1994–2012: The Lord Carrington
2012–present: The Duke of Abercorn

References

Order of the Garter